Llusk'a Llusk'a (Quechua llusk'a polished; slippery, "very slippery", also spelled Lluskha Lluskha) is a mountain in the Bolivian Andes which reaches a height of approximately . It is located in the Cochabamba Department, Arani Province, Vacas Municipality, northwest of Vacas. The Jatun Mayu, a tributary of Parqu Qucha, flows along its eastern and southern slopes.

References 

Mountains of Cochabamba Department